Bucknowle Farm is the site of a Romano-British settlement and a Roman villa, located one kilometre southeast of Church Knowle and one kilometre southwest of Corfe Castle village in Dorset, England. It is about seven kilometres south of Wareham and approximately nine kilometres west of Swanage in the heart of the Isle of Purbeck.

A number of Romano-British sites have been discovered and studied on the Isle of Purbeck. The Romano-British villa complex found at Bucknowle Farm is the first substantial villa to be found south of the Purbeck Hills. It was excavated between 1976 and 1991.

The first signs to its existence were unearthed in 1975 as fragments of pottery were found in a field. The excavations, that subsequently lasted until the summer of 1991, conclusively revealed a complex of domestic and farmstead buildings. Moreover, beneath these, a more complicated system of Iron Age and early Roman Age habitation was uncovered.

There is a camping site within the grounds of Bucknowle Farm.

References

Further reading
J. Collins, N. Field; A. Light, (1985), Excavations on the Roman Villa at Bucknowle Farm, Corfe Castle: A Summary of Work, 1976-84. Dorset Natural History & Archaeological Society. 
Tony Light, Peter Ellis (2009): Bucknowle, A Romano-British Villa and its ancedents: Excavations 1976-1991, Dorchester, 

Isle of Purbeck
Roman sites in Dorset
Villas in Roman Britain
Farms in Dorset
Campsites in the United Kingdom
Outdoor structures in England